Anacrusis guttula is a species of moth of the family Tortricidae. It is found in Napo Province, Ecuador.

The wingspan is about 28 mm for males and 32 mm for females. The ground colour of the forewings of the males is brownish, finely strigulated (streaked) brown and darker and more ferruginous brown along the costa, tinged with grey terminally. The hindwings are dark brown, yellower strigulated brown at the apex. The ground colour of the forewings of the females is creamish brown, strigulated brown and with traces of two whitish spots near the midtermen.

Etymology
The species name is derived from Greek guttula (meaning small droplet).

References

Moths described in 2010
Atteriini
Moths of South America
Taxa named by Józef Razowski